Le Mythe de la 5ème île  is a 2007 documentary film directed by Mohamed Saïd Ouma. It was selected by the African Film Festival of Cordoba - FCAT.

Synopsis 
This documentary explores the emigration myth. The main character's curiosity takes him to London, a cosmopolitan city where one must fight to survive, before he joins other communities with different horizons. Why do people from so many nationalities end up on that piece of land? Were they looking for something better? A fifth island?

References

External links 
 africultures.com

2007 films
Comorian documentary films
Documentary films about immigration
Documentary films about London
Immigration to the United Kingdom